Lumang Piso Para sa Puso is a drama television series and the 8th installment of the Precious Hearts Romances Presents series. The series will star real-life couple Kristine Hermosa and Oyo Sotto.

Plot
Sandra, who is always strapped for cash, discovers an antique coin among her dead grandmother's things and decides to sell it so that she can have the roof of their beloved house repaired.  She sells it to Dave, the owner of the only hobby shop in their town.  It is hate at first sight for the two of them, but Sandra brushes it aside, thinking that she would never see him again anyway.

But when Sandra's grandmother starts showing up in her dreams, Sandra realized that she had offended the woman who raised her by selling one of her prized belongings.  Sandra tries to buy back the coin from Dave, but he refuses because he needs the coin to complete the collection he started with his own dead father.  Sandra's best friend Joan comes up with a wacky idea, to just steal the coin back.

The two women end up breaking into the shop and reclaiming the coin.  Unfortunately, Dave figures out that Sandra was behind the break in and finds a way to steal back the coin.  His aunt though makes him feel guilty, so he agrees to give the coin back to Sandra – if she agrees to serve as his personal maid for two weeks.  As they spend more time with each other, they begin to fall in love... and not even bratty Mayor's daughter Erika or irritating suitor Konsehal Magtulis can get in their way.

Cast and characters

Main cast
 Kristine Hermosa as Sandra Perez -  An orphaned municipal clerk who is always strapped for cash. Sandra, who was raised by her grandmother and speaks like an old woman, has both serious /romantic side and a “kenkoy” side.
 Oyo Boy Sotto as Dave Pangilinan - The charming but childish owner of the hobby shop in their town. He's a happy-go-lucky guy and doesn't want to have too many responsibilities and doesn't like being too involved.

Supporting cast
 Niña Jose as Erika
 DJ Durano as Councilor Magtulis
 Niña Dolino as Joan
 Angel Jacob as Grace
 Edgar Sandalo as Mayor Gasti
 Mariel Sorino as Lolita
 Paul Salas as Young David
 Dorothy Ann Perez as Young Sandra
 Micah Muñoz as Paul

See also
 Precious Hearts Romances Presents

References

ABS-CBN drama series
2010 Philippine television series debuts
2010 Philippine television series endings
Philippine romance television series
Television shows based on books
Filipino-language television shows
Television shows filmed in the Philippines